The Mid Valley Region refers to the towns of Dickson City, Olyphant, Throop, and Blakely in Lackawanna County, Pennsylvania.   The area was once known for anthracite coal mining and is considered a smaller section of the Coal Region of PA.

The exact definition of the Mid Valley is vague as the Mid Valley School District only includes the towns of Olyphant, Dickson City and Throop (Although it may sometimes service Archibald and other assorted nearby locations).  However, the term for the region predated the formation of the school district.

Anthracite Coal Region of Pennsylvania
Geography of Lackawanna County, Pennsylvania